Stephen James Anaya is an American lawyer and the 16th Dean of the University of Colorado Boulder Law School. He was formerly the James J. Lenoir Professor of Human Rights Law and Policy at the University of Arizona's James E. Rogers College of Law and previously served for more than ten years on the faculty at the University of Iowa College of Law. In March
2008, he was appointed by the United Nations as its Special Rapporteur on the situation of the human rights and fundamental freedoms of indigenous people, replacing Rodolfo Stavenhagen. He was elected a Member of the American Philosophical Society in 2019.

Education and work 
Anaya is a graduate of the University of New Mexico (B.A., 1980) and Harvard Law School (J.D., 1983). At Harvard Law School, he was a member of the Board of Student Advisers.  He teaches and writes in the areas of international human rights, constitutional law, and issues concerning indigenous peoples. 
 
Anaya has served as a consultant for organizations and government agencies in numerous countries on matters of human rights and indigenous peoples, and he has represented indigenous groups from many parts of North and Central America in landmark cases before courts and international organizations. He was the lead counsel for the indigenous parties in the case of Awas Tingni v. Nicaragua, in which the Inter-American Court of Human Rights for the first time upheld indigenous land rights as a matter of international law. In addition, he directed the legal team that successfully achieved a judgment by the Supreme Court of Belize affirming the traditional land rights of the Maya people of that country.

On April 13, 2016, University of Colorado Boulder Provost Russell L. Moore announced the appointment of James (Jim) Anaya, Regents' Professor and James J. Lenoir Professor of Human Rights Law and Policy at the University of Arizona, as dean of the University of Colorado  Boulder Law School. Anaya began his duties on August 8, 2016. Anaya stepped down from his role as Dean of Colorado Law School effective June 30, 2021. He remains a distinguished faculty member.

Anaya is of Apache and Purépecha ancestry.

Selected publications

 International Human Rights: Problems of Law, Policy, and Practice (4th ed. 2006) (co-authored with Richard B. Lillich, Hurst Hannun & Dinah L. Shelton) 
 The Protection of Indigenous Peoples' Rights Over Lands and Natural Resources Under the Inter-American Human Rights System, 14 Harv. Hum. Rts. J. 33 (2001) (co-author with Robert A. Williams, Jr.).
 The Native Hawaiian People and International Human Rights Law: Toward a Remedy for Past and Continuing Wrongs, 28 Ga. L. Rev. 309 (1994), reprinted in International Law and Indigenous Peoples 309 (S. James Anaya ed., 2003).
 A Contemporary Definition of the International Norm of Self-Determination, 3 Transnat'l L. & Contemp. Probs. 131 (1993).
A complete list of his academic publications to 2009 is available on the University of Arizona website.

References

External links 
 
 Office of the United Nations Office High Commissioner for Human Rights 
 Curriculum Vitae
 Indigenous Peoples Law and Policy Program
 Harper, Samuel (1996) "James Anaya and the case of the Awas Tingni" Accessed 17 August 2009

1958 births
Living people
Place of birth missing (living people)
American academic administrators
American legal scholars
American officials of the United Nations
American people of Apache descent
American people of Purépecha descent
Harvard Law School alumni
Indigenous rights activists
International law scholars
Deans of law schools in the United States
Members of the American Philosophical Society
American lawyers
American academics
Scholars of Native American law
United Nations special rapporteurs
University of Arizona faculty
University of Colorado faculty
University of Colorado Law School faculty
University of New Mexico alumni